The 1947 Pepperdine Waves football team represented George Pepperdine College as an independent during the 1947 college football season. The Waves played home games at Sentinel Field on the campus of Inglewood High School in Inglewood, California. Pepperdine finished the season with an undefeated record of 9–0, dominating their opponents by scoring 349 points and allowing only 26 over the season. They had five consecutive shutouts to finish the season, with no opponent scoring more than seven points all year.

Schedule

Notes

References

Pepperdine
Pepperdine Waves football seasons
College football undefeated seasons
Pepperdine Waves football